Yannick Michiels (born 29 July 1991) is a Belgian orienteer. He is the first Belgian orienteer to receive a medal at the World Orienteering Championships, receiving a bronze medal in the sprint discipline at the 2022 World Orienteering Championships in Denmark.

Orienteering
He represented Belgium at the 2017 World Games in Poland, where he won a silver medal in the sprint distance. 

Michiels competed at the 2012, 2013, 2014 (7th in sprint), 2015 (5th in sprint) and 2017 World Orienteering Championships. In 2021, he became the first Belgian to receive a medal in the European Orienteering Championships.

In 2022, Michiels won Belgium's first medal at the World Orienteering Championships. In the sprint final, held in Vejle, Michiels won the bronze medal, coming behind Kasper Harlem Fosser and Gustav Bergman. Originally, Michiels placed fourth, but 
the runner who finished in third place (Kris Jones) was disqualified, giving Michiels the bronze medal.

Athletics
Michiels has also competed for Belgium in Athletics, taking 59th place at the 2015 European Cross Country Championships in France.

Personal life
Michiels is from Mol, Belgium.

References

External links
 
 Yannick Michiels at World of O
 Yannick Michiels at the International World Games Association

1991 births
Living people
Belgian orienteers
Foot orienteers
World Games silver medalists
Competitors at the 2017 World Games
World Games medalists in orienteering
20th-century Belgian people
21st-century Belgian people
Competitors at the 2022 World Games